Reanimated is the second remix album by Christian crunk rock band Family Force 5. The album was released independently on June 18, 2013. The album was later released with Capitol Records on October 1, 2013.

Track listing

References

Capitol Records remix albums
2013 remix albums